Frank J. Cooke (c. 1922 – c. 1996) was a two-term Republican mayor of Norwalk, Connecticut from 1961 to 1965. He had previously served as a two-term member and president of Norwalk's Common Council. Cooke was an engineer by profession and founded Cooke Vacuum Products in 1959. He operated it as an electronics manufacturer and research and development contractor until 1994.

Early life 
He was a veteran of World War II,  serving as a member of the Fourth Marine Division in the 4th Air Wing.

Mayoral administration  
In 1961, Cooke ran against Irving Freese and William O. Morrow in a three-way race for mayor. During his administration a Charter Revision Commission was appointed to make recommendations on the Norwalk Charter. He reactivated the Mayor's Committee on Intergroup Relations, which had originally been formed in 1960 to deal with local interracial problems. He won in a very close four-way race for his second term, narrowly beating Donald Irwin. He did not seek a third term.

Post mayoral career 
In March 1965, his company F.J. Cooke Inc. was put into involuntary bankruptcy. He formed a new company, Cooke Vacuum Products, Inc., which he opened in space rented from the Hat Corporation of America.

In March, 1988, he was appointed chairman of Norwalk Bank. He served as its chairman for two years.

In 1994, Cooke sold Cooke Vacuum Products to Richard Stein.

References 

1920s births
1996 deaths
4th Marine Division (United States)
American industrialists
20th-century American engineers
United States Marine Corps personnel of World War II
Connecticut city council members
Connecticut Republicans
Mayors of Norwalk, Connecticut
United States Marines
Engineers from Connecticut
20th-century American businesspeople
20th-century American politicians